Irina Alekseevna Nikolaeva  (b. 1962) is a linguist and Emeritus Professor of Linguistics at the SOAS University of London.

Biography
Nikolaeva gained her PhD from the University of Leiden in 1999. She worked at the University of Konstanz and the University of Oxford before joining SOAS in 2007 as a Lecturer. She was appointed Professor of Linguistics in 2012 and Emeritus Professor in 2020. She was awarded the Humanity Award at the 2008 Women of Discovery Awards. She was elected as a fellow of the British Academy in 2019.

Select publications
Nikolaeva, I. 2020. Yukaghir morphology in a historical and comparative perspective. München: Lincom GmbH.
Nikolaeva, I. and Spencer, A. 2019. Mixed categories: The Morphosyntax of noun modification. Cambridge: Cambridge University Press.
Nikolaeva, I. 2014. A grammar of Tundra Nenets. Berlin: Mouton de Gruyter.
Ackerman, F. and Nikolaeva, I. 2013. Descriptive typology and linguistics theory: a study in the morphosyntax of relative clauses. Stanford: CSLI.
Dalrymple, M.and *Nikolaeva, I. 2011. Objects and information structure. Cambridge: Cambridge University Press.

References

1962 births
Fellows of the British Academy
Living people
Leiden University alumni
Academics of the University of London
Women linguists
Members of Academia Europaea